Mitch Owens Road (Ottawa Road #8) runs along the border primarily of the former city of Gloucester and Osgoode Township. It was named for former Gloucester mayor Mitch Owens, an RCMP policeman who after Arctic and European service retired to a farm near the Canadian capital and took up local politics.

It runs from Manotick to Highway 417 in Vars. There is a gas station at the corner of Albion Road and Mitch Owens.

References

Roads in Ottawa